Mitchell Glacier is a glacier which descends steeply from Chaplains Tableland in the northeast of the Royal Society Range, Victoria Land, Antarctica, flowing east-northeast between Transit Ridge and Ibarra Peak to join the Blue Glacier drainage south of the Granite Knolls. It was named by the Advisory Committee on Antarctic Names in 1992 after J. Murray Mitchell, a climatologist with the U.S. Weather Bureau and successor agencies from 1955 to 1986. From 1974 onwards he played a significant part in the Polar Research Board of the National Academy of Sciences, and the Division of Polar Programs of the National Science Foundation.

References

Glaciers of Victoria Land
Scott Coast